Cleitus, Clitus or Kleitos may refer to:

People with the name
Cleitus the Black ( 375–328 BC), Macedonian officer and friend of Alexander the Great, killed by the latter after an argument
Cleitus the White (died 318 BC), Macedonian officer who rose to prominence after Alexander the Great's death
Cleitus (Dardania) (  335–295 BC), Illyrian king
Kleitos Kyrou, (1921–2006), Greek poet and translator

Other uses
Cleitus (mythology), multiple figures in Greek mythology
Kleitos, Kozani, a village in the Kozani municipality, Greece

See also
Cletis (disambiguation)
Cletus (disambiguation)